Faribault is a city in, and the county seat of, Rice County, Minnesota, United States. The population was 23,352 at the 2010 census.

Interstate 35 and Minnesota State Highways 3, 21, and 60 are four of Faribault's main routes.

Faribault is situated at the confluence of the Cannon and Straight Rivers in southern Minnesota.

History
Faribault is regarded as one of the most historic communities in Minnesota, with settlement and commercial activity predating Minnesota's establishment as a U.S. Territory.
Until 1745, the area was primarily occupied by the Wahpekute band of Dakotah. Shortly thereafter, the tribe was driven south after several clashes with the Ojibwe over territory.

The city's namesake, Alexander Faribault, was the son of Jean-Baptiste Faribault, a French-Canadian fur trader, and Elizabeth Pelagie Kinzie Haines, a Dakotah woman. He is credited with fueling most of the early settlement in the area, beginning in 1826, when he established a fur trading post on the banks of the Cannon River. By 1834, the trading post had grown in popularity and was relocated to the Straight River, one mile (1.6 km) upstream of its junction with the Cannon River, the site of modern-day Faribault. The young Alexander Faribault used his knowledge of Dakota language and culture to improve relations with the displaced Wahpekute and even helped the tribe to resettle in the area. This relationship was instrumental in ensuring the success of the trading post and allowing safe travel to the area for settlers. The Dakota in the area called this soon-to-be town "Adek" for Alex (Alexander Faribault).

Another source maintains the city is named for Jean-Baptiste Faribault. 

The Alexander Faribault House was built in 1853 by Alexander Faribault at a cost of $4,000. It is considered the oldest framed structure in the area, and still stands in its original location near the southeastern edge of Faribault's historic downtown district.

The years following the construction of this first building brought unprecedented growth, development, and economic prosperity to the young settlement. Spurred by the completion of the area's first steam-powered sawmill in early 1854, the next year took Faribault from a sleepy settlement of 20 buildings to a bustling town with more than 250. Historians attribute Faribault's impressive growth during this period to a number of important milestones in 1855 and 1856, including the creation of roads connecting to other settlements and trading posts in Iowa and Minnesota Territory, the availability of mail service, and the construction of schools and churches.

The City of Faribault was platted in 1855 and granted a home-rule charter in 1872.

Geography
The confluence of the Straight River and the Cannon River is located within city limits. Sakatah Lake State Park and Nerstrand-Big Woods State Park are nearby.

Interstate Highway 35 runs along the western edge of the city. The city is served by two full interchanges and one partial interchange. Before I-35's completion, traffic was routed through town, generating significant sales revenue to the retailers that had a major highway running past their doors. In approximately 1975, the last portions of I-35 were completed and through traffic started to bypass Faribault. On that same corridor through town, the White Sands Swimming Pool ("Minnesota's Largest Outdoor Swimming Pool") operated from 1964 to 1977. This swimming area is now the White Sands Dog Park, as well as the trailhead for the Sakatah Singing Hills Trail, which runs to Mankato. The Mill Towns Trail is planned to run to Northfield. The site includes parking, restrooms and a shelter.

Climate

Demographics

2010 census
As of the census of 2010, there were 23,352 people, 8,317 households, and 5,208 families living in the city. The racial makeup of the city was 82.6% White, 7.6% African American, 0.9% Native American, 2.1% Asian, 0.1% Pacific Islander, 4.4% from other races, and 2.3% from two or more races. Hispanic or Latino of any race were 13.0% of the population.

There were 8,317 households, of which 36.4% had children under the age of 18 living with them, 44.5% were married couples living together, 12.4% had a female householder with no husband present, 5.7% had a male householder with no wife present, and 37.4% were non-families. 31.0% of all households were made up of individuals, and 11.7% had someone living alone who was 65 years of age or older. The average household size was 2.50 and the average family size was 3.12.

The median age in the city was 35.4 years. 25.2% of residents were under the age of 18; 9.3% were between the ages of 18 and 24; 28.5% were from 25 to 44; 23.8% were from 45 to 64; and 13.1% were 65 years of age or older. The gender makeup of the city was 54.1% male and 45.9% female.

2000 census
As of the census of 2000, there were 20,818 people, 7,472 households, and 4,946 families living in the city. The ethnic/racial makeup of the city was 89.87% White, 2.69% African American, 0.67% Native American, 1.83% Asian, 0.06% Pacific Islander, 3.33% from other races, and 1.53% from two or more races. Hispanic or Latino of any race were 8.90% of the population.

There were 7,472 households, out of which 34.7% had children under the age of 18 living with them, 50.3% were married couples living together, 11.3% had a female householder with no husband present, and 33.8% were non-families. 28.5% of all households were made up of individuals, and 11.8% had someone living alone who was 65 years of age or older. The average household size was 2.53 and the average family size was 3.10.

In the city, the population was spread out, with 26.2% under the age of 18, 9.9% from 18 to 24, 30.7% from 25 to 44, 19.7% from 45 to 64, and 13.5% who were 65 years of age or older. The median age was 34 years. For every 100 females, there were 106.8 males. For every 100 females age 18 and over, there were 106.6 males.

The median income for a household in the city was $40,865, and the median income for a family was $49,662. Males had a median income of $32,404 versus $24,046 for females. The per capita income for the city was $18,610. About 5.8% of families and 9.0% of the population were below the poverty line, including 7.9% of those under age 18 and 13.1% of those age 65 or over.

Economy
Faribault has the usual gamut of small-town retail and service shops. Employers also include an assortment of light manufacturing offerings.

The main street, Central Avenue, is seeing a renaissance of redevelopment with most of the historic commercial block listed on the national register of historic places. Many buildings are being restored to their original appearance. Among them is the Paradise Center for the Arts, a multipurpose art center that is the result of a merger between the Faribault Art Center and the Faribault Area Community Theatre. Two longtime Faribault retailing/shopping institutions closed: the oldest, a longtime Central Avenue fixture, Jim & Joe's Clothiers closed after 125+ years of service due to a number of related factors. The other, Minnick's Food Market, was Faribault's last mom-and-pop grocery store and closed after 60+ years of operation in late 2006.

Herbert Sellner, a woodworker and maker of water slides, invented the Tilt-A-Whirl in 1926 at his Faribault home. Over the next year, the first 14 Tilt-A-Whirls were built in Sellner's basement and yard. In 1927, Sellner Manufacturing opened its factory in Faribault, and the ride debuted that year at the Minnesota State Fair.

Founded in 1865, the Faribault Woolen Mills stayed in continuous operation until 2009. Reopened in 2011, it is one of few remaining vertical woolen mills in the United States, taking raw wool and producing finished goods.

SAGE Electrochromics, a specialized window glass developer and wholly owned subsidiary of Saint-Gobain, is based in Faribault.

Politics
Faribault is in Minnesota's 1st congressional district, represented by Brad Finstad, a Republican.

Notable institutions

Education
The Minnesota State Academies for the Deaf and for the Blind, including the State Library for the Blind, are in southeastern Faribault, above the Straight River. Noyes Hall, a neoclassical building on the campus of Minnesota State Academy for the Deaf, is listed on the National Register of Historic Places. The building is named for Jonathon L. Noyes, the school's longtime administrator.

Shattuck-Saint Mary's is a coeducational boarding school especially noted for its Centers of Excellence program in hockey, winning numerous youth national championships and producing several NHL and Olympic team players.

South Central Community College (a Minnesota State College and University System institution) has a campus in Faribault.

The Faribault Public Schools operate an early childhood center, four elementary schools (one of which is a charter school), a middle school, Faribault High School, the Area Learning Center, and Faribault Education Center, which offers adult education. Students come from Faribault and surrounding communities and rural areas.

Other institutions
The Thomas Scott Buckham Memorial Library is the city library.

The Minnesota Correctional Facility - Faribault is a state prison on the campus of a former mental hospital (aka "The State Schools").

The River Bend Nature Center is a  nonprofit nature center in Faribault's southeast corner.

The Rice County Historical Society is in Faribault.

Notable people

Howard Bachrach (1920–2008), virologist and foot-and-mouth disease researcher 
George Ballis (1925–2010), photographer and activist whose photos documented the efforts of César Chávez and formation of United Farm Workers
Orville E. Birnstihl (1917–2015), Minnesota state representative, businessman, and farmer
Deming Bronson (1894–1957), Medal of Honor recipient
Stephen Chatman, Canadian composer, born in Faribault in 1950
Richard Cross, operatic bass-baritone
Mark Dusbabek, NFL player
Patrick Eaves, National Hockey League player for Detroit Red Wings; born in Calgary, Alberta but grew up in Faribault
David Wallace Illsley (1864–1951), Minnesota state legislator and farmer
Marsha Johnson Luknic (1943–1992), Minnesota state legislator and businesswoman
Tom Lieb (1899–1962), Olympic track and field athlete, All-American college football player and multi-sport coach
Mike Mason (1958–), former pitcher for the Texas Rangers
Diana E. Murphy (1934–2018), United States judge
Jake Petricka, Major League Baseball pitcher 
Roy W. Ranum, Minnesota state senator
Bruce Smith, 1941 Heisman Trophy winner
Ursula Batchelder Stone (1900–1985), professor, civic leader in Chicago
Elizabeth Strohfus, aviator
Arnin O. Sundet (1904–1980), businessman and Minnesota state legislator
Seung Wan "Wendy" Shon, member of South Korean group Red Velvet, lived in Faribault from 2007 to 2010
Henry Benjamin Whipple, first Episcopal bishop of Minnesota
Kuoth Wiel (1990–), South-Sudanese-American model and actress 
Raphael Louis Zengel, Faribault-born winner of Victoria Cross for actions performed with Canadian Expeditionary Force during World War I

See also
 Bethlehem Academy

References

External links

City of Faribault, MN – Official Website
Faribault Area Chamber of Commerce site
Faribault Tourism Department – Visitor Information Website
Faribault Public Schools
Rice County Historical Society

Additional historical resources
 Faribault Heritage Preservation Commission
 Preserving Faribault's Past
 Faribault Lives and Times
 Faribault, Our Community

 
Cities in Minnesota
Cities in Rice County, Minnesota
County seats in Minnesota
Populated places established in 1826
1826 establishments in Michigan Territory